Senapathi is a 2021 Indian Telugu-language crime thriller film directed by Pavan Sadineni. It is a remake of the 2017 Tamil-language film 8 Thottakkal. The film features an ensemble cast including Rajendra Prasad, Naresh Agastya, Harsha Vardhan, Gnaneswari Kandregula, Satya Prakash, Rakendu Mouli, Ravi Josh, A. Jeevan Kumar, Pavani Reddy, and Rocky. Senapathi premiered on 31 December 2021 on the streaming service Aha.

Plot

Cast 
 Rajendra Prasad as Krishna Murthy
 Naresh Agastya as Inspector Krishna
 Harsha Vardhan as Paramjyothi
 Gnaneswari Kandregula as Satya
 Satya Prakash as S.I. Purushotham
 Rakendu Mouli as Husain
 Ravi Josh as Raju
 A. Jeevan Kumar 
 Pavani Reddy
 Rocky

Production and release 
Director Pavan Sadineni who is known for his 2013 romcom Prema Ishq Kaadhal was signed to helm the remake of crime thriller 8 Thottakkal. Sadineni, however, prefers it to call a "semi-remake" because they added new characters and changed several aspects while retaining the crux of the original. The film marks the digital debut of veteran actor Rajendra Prasad. Filming began in September 2021 and took place in the neighbourhoods of Hyderabad including Kavadiguda, Sainikpuri, Moosapet, Quthbullapur and the Old City. Senapathi released digitally on 31 December 2021 on the streaming service Aha.

Reception 
Sangeetha Devi Dundoo of The Hindu appreciated the performances of Prasad and Agasthya and wrote: "Senapathi begins with the promise of an edge of the seat crime drama but gradually becomes an emotional tale. The emotional portions feel lengthy and stretched; had it been shorter, it would have added to the slow burn atmosphere of the crime drama." A reviewer from Eenadu appreciated the screenplay and stated that Sadineni had succeeded in adapting the Tamil film 8 Thottakkal to Telugu nativity. In an other positive review, Rajitha Chanti of TV9 Telugu also echoed the same, praising the performances and direction. On technical aspectings, Asianet News' Surya Prakash called Kalepu's cinematography a "highlight" while opining that Nerusu's editing could have been better. Production designed and score were also appreciated by Prakash.

References

External links 

 
 Senapathi on Aha

2021 crime thriller films
Indian crime thriller films
Telugu remakes of Tamil films
Films shot in Hyderabad, India
Films set in Hyderabad, India
2021 direct-to-video films
Aha (streaming service) original films